The Revolutionary Association of the Women of Afghanistan (RAWA) (Persian:جمعیت انقلابی زنان افغانستان, Jamiʿat-e Enqelābi-ye Zanān-e Afghānestān, Pashto:د افغانستان د ښڅو انقلابی جمعیت) is a women's organization based in Kabul, Afghanistan, that promotes women's rights and secular democracy. It was founded in 1977 by Meena Keshwar Kamal, an Afghan student activist who was assassinated in February 1987 for her political activities. The group, which supports non-violent strategies,  had its initial office in Kabul, Afghanistan, but then moved to Pakistan in the early 1980s.

The organization aims to involve women of Afghanistan in both political and social activities aimed at acquiring human rights for women and continuing the struggle against the government of Afghanistan based on democratic and secular, not fundamentalist principles, in which women can participate fully. RAWA also strives for multilateral disarmament. Since 1977, the group opposed all the Afghan government systems: the Democratic Republic of Afghanistan, the Islamic State of Afghanistan, the Islamic Emirate of Afghanistan (1996-2001), the Islamic Republic of Afghanistan (2001-2021), and the Islamic Emirate of Afghanistan (from 2021).

Background

The RAWA was first initiated in Kabul in 1977 as an independent social and political organization of Afghan women fighting for human rights and social justice. The organization then moved parts of its work out of Afghanistan into Pakistan and established their main base there to work for Afghan women.

Founder

RAWA was founded by a group of Afghan women led by Meena Keshwar Kamal. At age 21, she laid the foundations of RAWA through her work educating women. In 1979, Kamal began a campaign against the Soviet occupation and the Soviet-supported government of Afghanistan. In 1981, she launched a bilingual magazine Payam-e-Zan (Women's Message). In the same year, she visited France for the French Socialist Party Congress. She also established schools for Afghan refugee children, hospitals and handicraft centers for refugee women in Pakistan. Her activities and views, as well as her work against the government and religious fundamentalists led to her assassination on February 4, 1987.

Early activities

Much of RAWA's efforts in the 1990s involved holding seminars and press conferences and other fund-raising activities in Pakistan. RAWA also created secret schools, orphanages, nursing courses, and handicraft centers for women and girls in Pakistan and Afghanistan. They secretly filmed women being beaten in the street in Afghanistan by the Mutaween religious police, and being executed. RAWA activities were forbidden by both the Taliban and the United Islamic Front ("Northern Alliance"), but they persisted, and even publicised their work in publications like Payam-e-Zan.

RAWA after the 2001 invasion
RAWA is highly critical of the NATO intervention that began in 2001, because of the high rate of casualties among the civilian population. The organization went so far as to threaten to sue United States government for unauthorized use of four photos from their website that were used in propaganda handbills dropped on various cities in Afghanistan during the 2001 invasion.

After the defeat of the Taliban government, RAWA warned that the NATO-allied Afghan forces were just as fundamentalist and dangerous as the Taliban. They charge that the government led by President Hamid Karzai lacked support in most areas of Afghanistan, and that fundamentalists are enforcing laws unfairly treating women as they were under the Taliban. These claims are supported by media reports about the Herat government of Ismail Khan, who has created a Committee for the Propagation of Virtue and the Prevention of Vice that forces women to obey strict dress and behavior codes, as well as many reports by Human Rights Watch. One report released by Human Rights Watch in 2012 describes a situation where women are punished by the judicial system for attempting to escape from domestic abuse and also occasionally for being victims of rape. It says that Karzai is "[u]nwilling or unable to take a consistent line against conservative forces within the country," and that the lack of improvement in the plight of women in Afghanistan after ten years is "shocking."

Recent activities
RAWA collects funds to support hospitals, schools and orphanages and still run many projects in Pakistan and Afghanistan, including a project in conjunction with CharityHelp.org for orphan sponsorships. In 2020 RAWA restarted its mission inside Afghanistan and organized some of its events in Kabul. They have held events annually on International Women's Day since 2006.

On September 27, 2006, a RAWA member for the first time (perhaps in the whole history of RAWA) appeared on a round table debate on a local Afghan TV channel, TOLO TV. She had a debate with a representative of a hard line Islamic fundamentalist group. She named the top leaders of the Islamist groups and termed them "war criminal and responsible for the ongoing tragedy in Afghanistan." Tolo TV censored the audio of any sections where names were called.

On October 7, 2006, the Afghan Women's Mission (AWM) organized a fund raising event for RAWA in Los Angeles, California. Eve Ensler was the chief guest and radio host Sonali Kolhatkar and Zoya, a member of RAWA, were among the speakers. "Zoya" is a pseudonym for an active member of RAWA's Foreign Committee who has traveled to many countries, including the United States, Spain and Germany. In 2003, she received international acclaim for her biography Zoya’s Story - An Afghan Woman's Battle for Freedom. In June 2008, Zoya testified to the Human Rights Commission of the German Parliament (Bundestag) to persuade the German government to withdraw its troops from Afghanistan.

In 2009, RAWA and other women's rights groups strongly condemned a "Shia Family Code" which is claimed to legalise spousal rape within Northern Afghan Shia Muslim communities, as well as endorsing child marriage, purdah (seclusion) for married women, which was passed by President Hamid Karzai to garner support for his coalition government from hardline elements within the aforesaid communities, as well as the neighbouring Shia-dominated Islamic Republic of Iran. In addition to the above, the new "Family Code" also enshrines discriminatory legal status in the context of inheritance and divorce against women.

In February 2012, the group commemorated the 25th anniversary of the death of RAWA founder Meena Keshwar Kamal with a gathering of women in Kabul. In August 2012, a RAWA representative was a keynote speaker at the annual convention of Veterans For Peace at the University of Maryland in College Park.

Following the American and coalition exit from Afghanistan in August 2021, the Taliban swiftly regained control of the country. The new regime reinstituted an old policy of denying women and girls access to schooling. RAWA has operated secret schools for women to subvert this policy.

Recognition
RAWA has so far won 16 awards and certificates from around the world for its work for human rights and democracy. They include the sixth Asian Human Rights Award - 2001, the French Republic's Liberty, Equality, Fraternity Human Rights Prize, 2000, Emma Humphreys Memorial Prize 2001,
Glamour Women of the Year 2001, 2001 SAIS-Novartis International Journalism Award from Johns Hopkins University, Certificate of Special Congressional Recognition from the U.S. Congress, 2004, Honorary Doctorate from University of Antwerp (Belgium) for outstanding non-academic achievements, and many other awards.

Perspectives on RAWA
In the book With All Our Strength: The Revolutionary Association of the Women of Afghanistan
by Anne Brodsky, a number of world-known writers and human rights activists share their views of RAWA. They include Arundhati Roy who says "Each of us needs a little RAWA"; Eve Ensler, author of The Vagina Monologues, who suggests that RAWA must stand as a model for every group working to end violence; Katha Pollitt, author of Subject to Debate: Sense and Dissents on Women, Politics, and Culture; Ahmed Rashid, author of Taliban and Jihad; and Asma Jahangir, Special Rapporteur of the United Nations and prominent women's rights activist of Pakistan are two Pakistanis who write about RAWA and express their support.

See also

Gender roles in Afghanistan
Solidarity Party of Afghanistan
Taliban treatment of women

References

Further reading
Benard, Cheryl. 2002. Veiled Courage: Inside the Afghan Women's Resistance. New York: Broadway Books. 
Brodsky, Anne E. 2003. With All Our Strength: The Revolutionary Association of the Women of Afghanistan. New York: Routledge. 
Chavis, Melody Ermachild. 2004. Meena, Heroine of Afghanistan : The Martyr Who Founded RAWA, the Revolutionary Association of the Women of Afghanistan. New York: St. Martin's Griffin. 
Follain, John and Rita Cristofari. 2002. Zoya's Story: An Afghan Woman's Struggle for Freedom. New York: William Morrow. 

Mulherin, Jeannette E. 2004. The Revolutionary Association of the Women of Afghanistan and their Commitment to the Establishment of a Secular Government in Afghanistan. Georgetown University, Washington DC: Masters Thesis

External links

Afghan diaspora in Pakistan
Diaspora organisations in Pakistan
Secularism in Pakistan
Secularism in Afghanistan
Feminist organisations in Pakistan
Feminist organisations in Afghanistan
Maoist organisations in Afghanistan
Political organizations established in 1977
1977 in Afghanistan
Organisations based in Quetta
Socialist feminist organizations
Anti-fascist organizations
1977 establishments in Pakistan